Heart of the Night is the nineteenth album by the American jazz group Spyro Gyra, released in 1996 by GRP Records.

Track listing 
 "Heart of the Night" (Jay Beckenstein) – 4:34
 "De La Luz" (Julio Fernandez) – 5:14
 "Westwood Moon" (Tom Schuman) – 4:56
 "Midnight" (Jeremy Wall) – 4:26
 "Playtime" (Beckenstein) – 4:34
 "Surrender" (Beckenstein) – 4:47
 "Valentino's" (Schuman) – 4:56
 "Believe" (Fernandez) – 5:11
 "As We Sleep" (Scott Ambush) – 4:58
 "When Evening Falls" (Beckenstein) – 4:59
 "J Squared" (Beckenstein, Joel Rosenblatt) – 4:49
 "Best Thing" (Beckenstein) – 4:34

Personnel 
Spyro Gyra
 Jay Beckenstein – saxophones
 Tom Schuman – keyboards
 Julio Fernandez – guitars, vocals (2)
 Scott Ambush – bass guitar
 Joel Rosenblatt – drums
 Bashiri Johnson – percussion

Additional personnel
 Porter Carroll – vocals (1)
 Vaneese Thomas – vocals (1)
 Steve Skinner – drum programming (1)
 Dave Samuels – marimba (2, 7, 9, 10), vibraphone (2, 7, 9, 10)
 Eugene Moye – cello (2, 9)
 Jesse Levy – cello (2, 9)
 The No Sweat Horns – ensemble (3, 5)
 Scott Kreitzer – saxophones, flute, horn arrangements 
 Randy Andos – trombone
 Barry Danielian – trumpet
 Randy Brecker – trumpet (4)
 Chieli Minucci – arrangements (1)
 Jeremy Wall – vocal arrangements (1), cello arrangements (2, 9)

Production 
 Jay Beckenstein – producer 
 Jeremy Wall – assistant producer
 Doug Oberkircher – recording, mixing  
 Kristin Koerner – assistant engineer 
 Scott Hull – mastering 
 Hollis King – art direction 
 Jason Claiborne – graphic design
 Donna Raineri – photography 
 Phil Brennan – management

Studios 
 Recorded and Mixed at BearTracks Studios (Suffern, New York).
 Mastered at Masterdisk (New York City, New York).

References

External links
Spyro Gyra official web site

1996 albums
Spyro Gyra albums
GRP Records albums